Tuczno  is a village in the administrative district of Gmina Strzelce Krajeńskie, within Strzelce-Drezdenko County, Lubusz Voivodeship, in western Poland.

The village has a population of 710.

See also

 Tuczno

References

Tuczno